Why Don't You Love Me or Why Don't You Love Me? may refer to:

 "Why Don't You Love Me" (Beyoncé song)
 "Why Don't You Love Me" (Hank Williams song)
 "Why Don't You Love Me?", a song by Hot Chelle Rae featuring Demi Lovato from their 2011 album Whatever
 "Why Don't You Love Me", a song by Moon Mullican
 "Why Don't You Love Me?", a song by Tory Lanez from his 2018 album Love Me Now?
 "Why Don't You Love Me", an unreleased song by FKA Twigs and Dua Lipa

See also
"Why Don't You Haul Off and Love Me", by Wayne Raney